Sharen Jester Turney (born 1956) is a global business leader, and former president and CEO of Victoria's Secret (before 2019), a $7.7 billion company of which she led for a decade doubling the profit and increasing sales by 70%, Victoria's Secret is the largest retailer of intimate apparel, and the largest subsidiary of L Brands Inc (formerly Limited Brands Inc).  In 2013, Bloomberg named Jester Turney the fourth highest compensated female executive in the United States. In February 2016, she stepped down as CEO of Victoria's Secret after serving for a decade in that role and the previous six years as President and CEO of Victoria's Secret Direct.

Career
Turney attended the University of Oklahoma, graduating with a Bachelor of Arts degree in Business Education with a minor in public relations. Upon graduation in 1979, she began her career as a buyer for Foley's, a department store chain in Houston, Texas.

Following stints at Byer California and Federated Department Stores, Turney joined Neiman Marcus, where she became executive vice president of merchandising and then senior vice president and general merchandise manager. She finished her career at Neiman Marcus as president and CEO of NM Direct, the company's e-commerce and catalog division, Horchow Catalog and Chefs Catalog. In 2000, she became the CEO of Victoria's Secret Direct, the e-commerce and catalog division of the successful women's apparel and lingerie brand, Victoria's Secret.

In July 2006, Turney was promoted to President and CEO of Victoria's Secret. As CEO, she has overseen an increase in total sales revenue from $4.5 billion to over $7.7 billion and more than doubled the profit in 2015. Victoria's Secret is currently the largest subsidiary of L Brands Inc at 40% of total revenue. She resigned as CEO of Victoria's Secret in February 2016.

Turney serves as chairman of the board of directors for the Research Institute at Nationwide Children’s Hospital, and serves on the Jay H. Baker Retailing Initiative advisory board at The Wharton School, University of Pennsylvania. Turney was also a member of the board of directors for M/I Homes, Inc. for eight years resigning in 2019.  She is also actively involved with The Center for Family Safety and Healing.

Turney’s advisory roles span the globe and include London based Marks and Spencer, Gloria Jeans in Russia, Cosmo Lady the largest intimate wear company in China, Full Beauty Brands in New York and technology companies Feedvisor, NewStore, and Joox. She also serves on the board of directors for Sweden based global brand Happy Socks and US based Alliance Data Systems, and We Are HAH.

In December 2018, Turney becomes interim CEO of private apparel company, Gloria Jeans.

Awards and recognition
In 2018, Sharen Jester Turney received the University of Oklahoma's Celebration of Education Award of Distinction, the college's highest honor, presented to alumni, friends or advocates of education who have achieved state, national or international distinction in their fields of endeavor. The event raises money for scholarships to the university.

In 2016, Turney was honored at the Way to Win Gala in New York for her support of the organizations work to assist homeless women and children on their journey toward independence. The event is Way to Win's largest annual fundraiser.

In 2015,
Sharen Jester Turney was inducted into the state of Oklahoma Hall of Fame, the highest honor
bestowed on an Oklahoman. Watch the induction ceremony on PBS here.

In March 2014 Glassdoor included Sharen Turney "America's Favorite Bosses" CEO ranking list (she was one of only two women to make the list). In March 2013, Turney was the only female CEO in the Top 50 of Glassdoor's "America's Favorite Bosses" list.  In 2011, Turney ranked in the Top 10 of the Glassdoor's ten most popular retail CEOs.

In 2005, Turney received the Dr. Catherine White Achievement Award from HeartShare Human Services in New York City. In 2009, she received the H.U.G. Award from the Intimate Apparel Square Club (IASC) in honor of her participation in raising funds for pediatric charities. In 2013, she was inducted into the Hall of Fame for the business education department at the University of Oklahoma, her alma mater. During her time at the university, she was a member of the Delta Gamma fraternity.

In 2004, Sharen Turney accepted the Femmy Award from The Underfashion Club

In 1997 and while at Neiman Marcus, Turney received the distinguished Fashion Medal of Honor.

Personal life and philanthropy 
Turney was born in 1956 in Ardmore, Oklahoma, and grew up on a farm to a cattle rancher father and teacher and nutritionist mother. She has been married for more than 25 years to her husband Charles and they have a son, Matthew. The family currently resides in New Albany, Ohio, splitting time between residences in Manhattan.

Turney serves on several boards and committees. She is on the Board of Trustees for the University of Oklahoma Foundation, on the Board of Directors for Nationwide Children's Hospital. She is also Chairman of the Research Institute for Nationwide Children's Hospital. Turney is also part of the Industry Advisory Committee for the Jay H. Baker Retailing Center at the Wharton School of the University of Pennsylvania. For Turney, giving back personally and through the companies she represents is a way of life.

A few of Sharen Jester Turney's generous giving includes The James at The Ohio State University Comprehensive Cancer Center. her alma mater University of Oklahoma,  and Nationwide Children's Hospital. www.nationwidechildrens.org/Document/Get/116127.  In addition, Turney has established scholarships for young girls education in the United States and abroad.

References

American retail chief executives
People from Ardmore, Oklahoma
Living people
University of Oklahoma alumni
1956 births
American women chief executives
American chief executives of fashion industry companies
21st-century American women